AWD may refer to:

Biology
 African Wild Dog (Lycaon pictusa), a canid of sub-Saharan Africa
 Acute watery diarrhoea, liquid faeces

Businesses and organisations
 AWD Holding, (Allgemeiner Wirtschaftsdienst), a German company
 AWD Trucks, a British truck manufacturer
 Atomwaffen Division, a neo-Nazi terrorist group in the United States

Computing
 Adaptive web design, the progressive enhancement of a website
 Artweaver document, the default file extension used by the freeware raster graphics editor developed by Boris Eyrich
 Microsoft Fax Microsoft at Work Document (file extension)

Laws
 Agency Worker Directive (2008/104/EC)
 Americans with Disabilities Act

Vehicles
 Air Warfare Destroyer, a ship class of the Royal Australian Navy 
 All-wheel drive, a power-train configuration for vehicles, most commonly four-wheel and six-wheel drive

Other uses
 Afghan War Diary, a collection of thousands of US military documents that were leaked to the public via Wikileaks in July, 2010
 Americans with disabilities